Grace Digital Inc is a consumer electronics company based in San Diego, with research and development locations in Cambridge, England; Taipei, Taiwan; and Seoul, Korea. It was founded in 2007 by James D. Palmer and Greg Fadul. The company’s main products are internet based radio receivers, audio archiving equipment, wireless speaker systems, and waterproof personal audio devices and gadgets, which have been given CES Innovations Awards.

Brand names
Grace Digital products are sold under the "Grace Digital Audio", "Victoria", and "EcoXgear" brands.

Consumer products
Grace Digital manufactures internet radios, audio archiving devices, weather-resistant outdoor speakers and speakers for personal music devices.

Business products
Grace Digital has adapted its devices to be used in a business environment, most notably for music on hold and overhead in-store music, also known as elevator music.

History
Grace Digital was founded by James D. Palmer and Greg Fadul in 2007.

See also
Sirius Satellite Radio
Reciva
Network Media Player
Pandora Radio

References

External links 
 
 

Electronics companies of the United States
Companies based in San Diego
American companies established in 2007
Manufacturing companies based in California